Aleksandr Chumakov (15 April 1927 – 23 July 2019) was a Russian sailor who competed for the Soviet Union in the 1952 Summer Olympics and in the 1956 Summer Olympics.

References

1927 births
2019 deaths
Russian male sailors (sport)
Soviet male sailors (sport)
Olympic sailors of the Soviet Union
Sailors at the 1952 Summer Olympics – Star
Sailors at the 1956 Summer Olympics – 12 m2 Sharpie